Ross E. Rowland, Jr. (born 1940) is a figure in United States railroad preservation. He has run public and demonstration excursions on existing railroads utilizing steam locomotives.

Steam Excursion Career 

Ross Rowland began operating steam excursion trains in the form of his newly formed High Iron Company on October 13, 1966, and he would subsequently create several trains that would be pulled by steam, including the Golden Spike Centennial Limited train in 1969. Rowland's most famous accomplishment was The American Freedom Train, a steam-powered exhibit train which toured much of the continental US over 1975 and 1976 in conjunction with the celebration of the U.S. Bicentennial.

Rowland has been connected with and operated several U.S. excursion steam locomotives such as the Canadian Pacific 1278 4-6-2, currently at the Age of Steam Roundhouse, Sugarcreek, Ohio; the Canadian Pacific 1238 and 1286 4-6-2s, currently under private ownership in Manitoba; the Nickel Plate Road 759 2-8-4, currently at Steamtown National Historic Site, Scranton, Pennsylvania; the Reading 2101 4-8-4, currently at the Baltimore and Ohio Railroad Museum in Baltimore, Maryland; and the Chesapeake and Ohio 614 4-8-4.

During the 1980s, with a spike in oil prices, Rowland was instrumental in forming American Coal Enterprises, an organization dedicated to the design and production of modern, coal-fired, reciprocating, direct-drive steam locomotives designed to reduce or eliminate operational concerns associated with steam locomotives and to operate with enough efficiency to be economically viable to railroads. Rowland managed to obtain permission from CSX Transportation to operate C&O 614 in freight service in 1985, to obtain data in order to finalize the ACE 3000 design. The ACE 3000 originally started development as a Steam turbine locomotive design, but was changed to a traditional reciprocating drive as development continued. 

A preliminary design for the ACE 3000 was developed, but active development stopped prior to any effort to build a demonstrator or prototype when oil prices fell in the mid-1980s, and it appeared that the disparity between coal and oil would not be sustained at a level significant enough to expect that a coal-fired locomotive would be economically feasible.

In 1992, Rowland along with Ralph Weisinger proposed the 21st Century Limited, a theme train hauled by C&O 614 with custom railcars and displays. Rowland initially projected the train would run by 1996, and 614 was briefly wrapped in the colors of the train for a photoshoot to advertise the project. The project would eventually be cancelled.

In the 1990s, Rowland operated public excursions on New Jersey Transit between Hoboken and Port Jervis until the retirement of C&O 614. Rowland has been a critic of the efficiency and effectiveness of the Steamtown National Historic Site.

Pacific Wilderness tourist train 

In the summers of 2000 and 2001, Rowland managed the Pacific Wilderness Railway (PAW) on Vancouver Island, British Columbia. This short-lived tourist train consisted of a few older coaches pulled by 2 GP20 diesels, traveling from Victoria to the peak of Malahat before returning to Victoria. The operation was criticized for lacking any proper station or accommodations at Malahat, and a lack of scenic sights along the route. Further criticism highlighted the age of the rolling stock, a failure to attract cruise traffic such as the success of Alaska's White Pass and Yukon Route, and the failure to bring in an operating steam engine due to weight limits on bridges over the PAW line. The operation failed, and ended operations in July 2001.

Later career 

In early 2011, Rowland announced the planned operation of the Greenbrier Presidential Express, a luxury train set to operate from Washington, D.C. to the Greenbrier Resort in White Sulphur Springs, WV. However, problems with capacity on the Buckingham Branch Railroad and with steam operation into Washington, D.C. killed the project's feasibility.  By 2014, many of the passenger cars bought for the Greenbrier Express were sold at auction, bringing an end to the project.

C&O 614 was moved from storage in Pennsylvania to static display at the Virginia Museum of Transportation in 2011. It has since been moved to display in Clifton Forge, Virginia, at the C&O Railway Heritage Center, where it is currently wearing the green paint scheme of the failed Greenbrier Express project. Although on static display, Rowland still owns the engine through the American Freedom Train Foundation.

In 2021, Rowland received a lifetime achievement award from the HeritageRail Alliance.

References

External links
The Ultimate Steam Page - Information on Ross Rowland's ACE 3000 and other modern steam projects
The Story of America's Freedom Trains - Information on the 1975 - 1976 American Freedom Train
ThemeTrains.com - Information on the High Iron Company's Golden Spike Centennial Limited of 1969
The Yellow Ribbon Express 
Chesapeake and Ohio Historical Society

1940 births
Living people
21st-century American historians
21st-century American male writers
American transportation businesspeople
American male non-fiction writers